Pär-Ola Jonas Jonasson (born Per Ola Jonasson; 6 July 1961) is a Swedish journalist and writer, best known as the author of the best-seller The Hundred-Year-Old Man Who Climbed Out the Window and Disappeared.

Biography 
The son of an ambulance driver and a nurse, Jonasson was born and raised in Växjö in southern Sweden. After studying Swedish and Spanish at the University of Gothenburg, Jonasson worked as a journalist for the Växjö newspaper Smålandsposten, and for the Swedish evening tabloid Expressen, where he remained until 1994. In 1996, he founded a media company, OTW, which grew to 100 employees. He stopped working in 2003, after having two major back operations and being overworked. He later sold his company.
In 2007, he completed his first book The Hundred-Year-Old Man Who Climbed Out the Window and Disappeared. It was published in Sweden in 2009. Since 2010, Jonasson has been living with his son on the Swedish island of Gotland.

Awards 
Swedish Booksellers Award (2010).
German Pioneer Prize (M-Pionier Preis) from Mayersche Buchhandlung (2011).
Danish Audiobook Award (2011).
Prix Escapades (2012).

Bibliography 

Jonasson's first novel has achieved worldwide success. Telling the story of the incredible adventures in the life of a centenarian who escapes from a home, it has been translated into some 35 languages, selling over a million copies in Germany and over 2.5 million worldwide (as of 2012).
 Hundraåringen som klev ut genom fönstret och försvann, Piratförlaget, Stockholm 2009. . 
 The Hundred-Year-Old Man Who Climbed Out the Window and Disappeared, paperback, Hyperion Books, United States, 2012. .
 The Hundred-Year-Old Man Who Climbed Out of the Window and Disappeared (translated by Rod Bradbury), Hesperus Press, London, 2012. .
 Der Hundertjährige, der aus dem Fenster stieg und verschwand (translated by Wibke Kuhn), carl's books, München 2011, . 
 Le Vieux qui ne voulait pas fêter son anniversaire, Paris, Presses de la Cité, 2011.  . 
 Stoletý stařík, který vylezl z okna a zmizel (translated by Zbyněk Černík), Mladá Boleslav, Panteon, 2012.  . 
 A százéves ember, aki kimászott az ablakon és eltűnt, Budapest, Athenaeum, 2011.  (Hungarian)
 Stogodišnjak koji je iskočio kroz prozor i nestao (translated by Marija Popović), Mladinska knjiga Beograd, 2013,  (Serbian)
 Ο εκατοντάχρονος που πήδηξε από το παράθυρο και εξαφανίστηκε, Ψυχογιός, Αθήνα 2013,  (Greek)
 Stulatek, który wyskoczył przez okno i zniknął (translated by Joanna Myszkowska-Mangold), Świat Książki, Warszawa, 2012.  
 သက်တော်ရာကျော်ရှည်စေသော်ဝ် (ဘာသာပြန်=သင့်လူ), (Myanmar)
 "הזקן בן המאה שיצא מהחלון ונעלם" (translated by Ruth Shapira), Keter Books, Ben Shemen, 2011, . 
 Столітній чоловік, що виліз у вікно і зник (translated by Natalia Ilishchuk), Кафе Птах, Lviv, 2021.  

Jonasson's second novel, about an orphan from Soweto who by chance becomes involved in international politics, was released on 25 September 2013:
 Analfabeten som kunde räkna, Piratförlaget, Stockholm 2013. . 
 The Girl Who Saved the King of Sweden, Ecco Press, New York City, 2014. ;
 Die Analphabetin, die rechnen konnte. (translated by Wibke Kuhn), carl's books, München 2013, . 
 Az analfabéta, aki tudott számolni, Budapest, Athenaeum, 2013.  (Hungarian)
 L'Analphabète qui savait compter, Paris, Presses de la Cité, 2013, . 
 Η αναλφάβητη που ήξερε να μετρά, Εκδόσεις Ψυχογιός, Αθήνα 2014.  (Greek)
 Analfabetka, která uměla počítat (translated by Luisa Robovská), Turnov, Panteon, 2015.   
 Analfabetka, która potrafiła liczyć (translated by Bratumiła Pawłowska-Pettersson), Wydawnictwo W.A.B., Warszawa, 2015.  
 ကယ္တင္႐ွင္  (ဘာသာပြန်=သင့်လူ), (Myanmar)
 "האנאלפביתית שידעה לספור" (translated by Ruth Shapira), Keter Books, Ben Shemen, 2014, . 

Jonasson's third novel, which begins with a chance meeting between a hotel desk clerk, a released prisoner and a former priest was released on 23 September 2015:
 Mördar-Anders och hans vänner (samt en och annan ovän), Piratförlaget, Stockholm 2015. . 
 Mörder Anders und seine Freunde nebst dem einen oder anderen Feind. (translated by Wibke Kuhn), carl's books, München 2016, . 
 Hitman Anders and the Meaning of It All, London, 4th Estate, 2016. .
 L’assassin qui rêvait d'une place au paradis, Paris, Presses de la Cité, 2016. . 
 Ο Άντερς ο φονιάς και οι φίλοι του Ψυχογιός, Αθήνα 2016,  (Greek)
 Gyilkos-Anders és barátai (meg akik nem azok) Budapest, Athenaeum Kiadó, 2015.  (Hungarian edition)
 Zabiják Anders a jeho přátelé (a sem tam nepřítel) (translated by Hana Švolbová), Praha, Panteon, 2016. 
 Anders morderca i przyjaciele (oraz kilkoro wiernych nieprzyjaciół) (translated by Elżbieta Ptaszyńska-Sadowska), Wydawnictwo W.A.B., Warszawa, 2016.  
 လက္မ႐ြံ႕အန္ဒါ  (ဘာသာပြန်=သင့်လူ), (Myanmar)
 "הרוצח שחלם על מקום בגן עדן" (translated by Ruth Shapira), Keter Books, Ben Shemen, 2016, . 

Jonasson's fourth novel, The Accidental Further Adventures of the Hundred-Year-Old Man, was published in 2018.
 The Accidental Further Adventures of the Hundred-Year-Old Man (translated by Rachel Willson Broyles), 4th Estate, 2018, 
 Der Hundertjährige, der zurückkam, um die Welt zu retten.(translated by Wibke Kuhn), carl's books, München 2018, . 
 သက်တော်ရာကျော်ထပ္ကာရှည်စေသော်ဝ် (ဘာသာပြန်=သင့်လူ), (Myanmar)
 A százegy éves ember, aki azon gondolkodott, hogy túl sokat gondolkodik (Hungarian) -  Budapest, Athenaeum Kiadó Kft., 2019, 
 "הזקן בן המאה ואחת שחשב שהוא חושב יותר מדי" (translated by Ruth Shapira), Keter Books, Ben Shemen, 2019. 

Jonasson's fifth novel, Sweet Sweet Revenge Ltd., was published in 2021
 Sweet Sweet Revenge Ltd (translated by Rachel Willson Broyles), HarperVia GB, 2021, 
 "נקמה מתוקה בע"מ" (translated by Ruth Shapira), Keter Books, Ben Shemen, 2021. 

Jonasson's sixth novel, The Prophet and the Idiot, was published in 2022
 Profeten och idioten, Bokförlaget Polaris, [Stockholm], 2022, 
 Drei fast geniale Freunde auf dem Weg zum Ende der Welt (translated by Astrid Arz), C. Bertelsmann, München, 2022, 
 De profeet en de idioot (translated by Angélique de Kroon), Signatuur, Amsterdam 2022,

External links
 Jonas Jonasson's Website

References 

21st-century Swedish novelists
1961 births
People from Växjö
Living people
Swedish journalists
Swedish male novelists
21st-century male writers
University of Gothenburg alumni